The 1872 Flint Boroughs by-election was fought on 16 October 1872.  The byelection was fought due to the incumbent Liberal MP, Sir John Hanmer, being elevated to the peerage.  It was won by the Liberal candidate Sir Robert Cunliffe, who was unopposed.

Results

References

1872 in Wales
1870s elections in Wales
History of Flintshire
1872 elections in the United Kingdom
By-elections to the Parliament of the United Kingdom in Welsh constituencies
Unopposed by-elections to the Parliament of the United Kingdom in Welsh constituencies